Manley Hall may refer to

Manley Hall, Erbistock, at Erbistock south of Wrexham
Manley Hall, Manchester, a demolished house in Whalley Range
Manley Hall, Staffordshire, a partly demolished country house near Lichfield

Architectural disambiguation pages